Flickering Lights (Danish: Blinkende Lygter) is a 2000 Danish black comedy crime film directed and written by Anders Thomas Jensen, and starring Søren Pilmark, Mads Mikkelsen, Ulrich Thomsen, Iben Hjejle, and Nikolaj Lie Kaas.

Plot
Four small-time gangsters from Copenhagen trick a gangster boss: they steal over 4,000,000 Danish kroner which they were supposed to bring him. Trying to escape to Barcelona they are forced to stop in the countryside, in an old, wrecked house, hiding there for several weeks. Slowly, one after another, they realize that they would like to stay there, starting a new life, renovating the house and turning it into a restaurant. But their past eventually catches up with them.

Cast
 Søren Pilmark as Torkild
 Ulrich Thomsen as Peter
 Mads Mikkelsen as Arne
 Nikolaj Lie Kaas as Stefan
 Sofie Gråbøl as Hanne (Stefan's girlfriend)
 Iben Hjejle as Therese (Torkild's girlfriend)
 Ole Thestrup as Alfred (Hunter)
 Frits Helmuth as Carl (doctor)
 Peter Andersson as The Faroese
 Niels Anders Thorn as William
 Henning Jensen as Peters Father
 Solbjørg Højfeldt as Peters Mother

Accolades 
 Robert Festival 2001:
Audience Award
Best Cinematography

References

External links 
 
 
 Flickering Lights at Eurochannel

2000 films
2000 black comedy films
2000s crime comedy films
Danish action comedy films
Danish black comedy films
Danish crime comedy films
2000s Danish-language films
Films directed by Anders Thomas Jensen
Films with screenplays by Anders Thomas Jensen
Films set in Denmark
2000 action comedy films
2000 directorial debut films
2000 comedy films